Ventimiglia is a resort town  in the province of Imperia, Liguria, northern Italy. Ventimiglia's urban area has a population of 55,000.

Etymology
The similarity to the phrase  ("twenty miles") is coincidental, although the town was almost exactly 20 statute miles from France between 1388 and 1860.

History 
Ventimiglia is the ancient Album Intimilium, the capital of the Intimilii, a Ligurian tribe. In AD 69 the city was sacked by the army of Otho and Vitellius, but recovered to remain prosperous into the 5th century, surrounded by walls with cylindrical towers built at each change of direction.

In the Gothic Wars it was besieged by the Byzantines and the Goths, and later suffered from the raids of Rothari, King of the Lombards, but flourished again under Rodoald. In the 10th century it was attacked by the Saracens of Fraxinet. After a period as an independent commune, it was ruled by the Counts of Ventimiglia, and often had to fight with the Republic of Genoa.

In 1139 the Genoese attacked it by land and sea and forced it to surrender; the count continued to hold the city and countship as a vassal of the victors. The city rebelled more than once against the Genoese and sided with their enemies.

In 1271 in a war with Genoa its podestà Luca Grimaldi was captured. Ventimiglia was thus temporarily held by the dukes of Savoy (1389 and 1746) and King Ladislaus of Naples (1410). In 1505 it was annexed to the Genoese Republic, sharing its history until the early 19th century.

In 1269 the Count of Ventimiglia, Gugliemo Pietro I Balbo married Eudossia Laskaris, daughter of Emperor Theodore II Laskaris. From them started the dynasty of the Lascaris of Tenda. They maintained the sovereign County of Tenda until 1501 when the last of them, Anne Lascaris, married Renato of Savoy (in French René de Savoie) and transferred the County to his cadet branch of Savoy dynasty. The most famous exponent of this branch of Lascaris was Beatrice of Tenda.

Main sights 

Remains of a Roman theatre (first half of the 2nd century) are visible, and remains of many other buildings have been discovered, among them traces of the ancient city walls, a fine mosaic, found in 1852 but at once destroyed, and a number of tombs to the west of the theatre. The ruins of the ancient Albintimilium are situated in the plain of Nervia, c.  to the east of the modern town.

The caves of the Balzi Rossi have proved rich in palaeolithic remains of the Quaternary period. Remains of a family of Cro-Magnon people were discovered, with several skeletons of men, women and children.

Very important architecturally and historically is the ancient medieval city centre, perched on a hill overlooking the new town. The Church of San Michele Arcangelo was erected in the 10th century by the Counts of Ventimiglia on the foundations of a pagan temple. Later it was entrusted to the Benedictines of Lirins. In the 11th-12th centuries it was rebuilt in Romanesque style. In 1628 its aisles were lost after an earthquake. It houses milestones from the old Via Iulia Augusta, two of which are used as stoups and one supports the crypt's vault.

The present Romanesque Cathedral dedicated to the Assumption, Cattedrale di Nostra Signora Assunta, with an 11th-century baptistery, see of the present Diocese of Ventimiglia-San Remo (just Ventimiglia until 1957, founded 670), is built on the ruins of an earlier Lombard church, which in turn was on the site of a Roman building, possibly a temple.

The municipal library has the second largest collection of 17th-century manuscripts and books in Italy (the biggest collection is in Venice).

The Giardini Botanici Hanbury (Hanbury Botanical Gardens), surrounding the villa of Sir Thomas Hanbury, La Mortola, are the biggest in Italy and among the finest in Europe, boasting many varieties of tropical and sub-tropical species that thrive in this mild climate.

Near Ventimiglia are the Genoese fortresses of Castel d'Appio, Forte San Paolo and Fortezza dell'Annunziata.

Tourism 
Ventimiglia is a popular summer destination for tourists on the French Riviera. Particularly popular all year with visitors from France is the weekly street market (held on a Friday), along the seafront of the new town, which causes major traffic congestion.

Transportation 
Ventimiglia is on the Via Aurelia Provincial Road, and has a junction on the A10 Motorway. 

The Ventimiglia railway station connects the line from Genoa to France with the line to Cuneo.

International relations 

There is a Royal Spanish honorary consulate at Ventimiglia.

Twin towns – Sister cities
Ventimiglia is twinned with:
 Piazza Armerina, Sicily

See also 
 Diocese of Ventimiglia-San Remo
 Seborga

References

External links 

 
Richard Stillwell, ed. Princeton Encyclopedia of Classical Sites, 1976: "Albintimilium (Ventimiglia), Liguria, Italy"

Roman towns and cities in Italy
Cities and towns in Liguria
Italian Riviera
Castles in Italy